Palacio de los Deportes (English language:Palace of Sports) is an indoor arena with capacity for 7,500 persons located in Heredia, Costa Rica.

The arena regularly hosts local events such as sporting events, concerts, and trade shows.

In 2004, the arena hosted the CONCACAF Futsal Championship.  
It was built in 1989.

Services that the Palacio de los Deportes offers:
 Gym
 Pool
 Spa
 Karate
 Soccer camp
 Concerts
 Matches

Notable events 
Concerts
 Disney Live! - Mickey's Magic Show
 Aerosmith
 Ricardo Arjona
 Gustavo Cerati
 Ricardo Montaner
 Ana Belén y Víctor Manuel
 Diego Torres
 Mercedes Sosa
 Bon Jovi
 Fabulosos Cadillacs
 Mägo de Oz
 Heroes del Silencio
 Joaquín Sabina
 David Bisbal
 Yuridia
 Belinda
 Café Tacuba
 Julieta Venegas
 Sin Bandera
 Kudai
 Sting
 Roxette
 Franco de Vita
 Sean Paul
 Survivor
 Camilo Sesto
 La Quinta Estación
 Todos Tus Muertos
 UB40. Year 1994.
 INXS
 Roberto Carlos
 Júlio Iglesias
 Dream Theater. Year 2012
 Evanescence. Year 2012
  José Luis Perales . Year 2012
 La Oreja de Van Gogh
 Alex Ubago
 Axe Bahia
 Enrique Bunbury

National events
 Telethon

Sport
 Hosted the CONCACAF Futsal Championship.
 Home of Ferreteria Brenes-Barva Costa Rican 1st Division Basketball Team

References

External links 
Teleton Costa Rica

Indoor arenas in Costa Rica
Buildings and structures in Heredia Province
Basketball venues in Costa Rica